Pierre-Hugues Herbert and Édouard Roger-Vasselin were the defending champions but Roger-Vasselin decided not to participate.
Herbert played alongside Laurent Rochette.
Laurynas Grigelis and Uladzimir Ignatik won the title 6–7(4–7), 6–3, [10–6] against Jordi Marsé-Vidri and Carles Poch-Gradin in the final.

Seeds

Draw

Draw

References
 Main Draw

Trophee des Alpilles - Doubles
2012 Doubles